Rusmir Mahmutćehajić (born 29 June 1948 in Stolac, Bosnia and Herzegovina) is a Bosnian academic, author, and former politician. He is a Professor of applied physics in the University of Sarajevo. He lives in Sarajevo, where he works as the president of International Forum Bosnia. He served as Deputy Prime Minister and as Energy minister through the process of independence and four of the five years of war (1991–95) in the Bosnia and Herzegovina government.

He is the author of more than 20 works in Bosnian, many of which have been published in English, French, Italian, and Turkish translations.

Publications (selection) 
The author of more than 20 books (12 translated in multiple languages) and hundreds of essays and articles, his publications include:
 1977 – Krhkost
1996 – Suđeni Stolac
2000 – Bosnia the Good: Tolerance and Tradition
2000 - The denial of Bosnia
 2003 - Sarajevo essays: politics, ideology, and tradition
2005 - Learning from Bosnia: approaching tradition
2006 - The mosque: the heart of submission
2007 - On love: in the Muslim tradition
2011 – On the other: a Muslim view
2011 - Across the river: on the poetry of Mak Dizdar
2011 - Maintaining the sacred center: the Bosnian city of Stolac
2015 - The praised and the virgin

References

Living people
1948 births
People from Stolac
Bosnia and Herzegovina politicians